Umoljani is a village in the municipality of Trnovo, Bosnia and Herzegovina. The village is located at an elevation of over 1200 meters.

Demographics 
According to the 2013 census, its population was 40, all Bosniaks.

References

Populated places in Trnovo, Sarajevo